G1-b is  one of the subsidiary pyramids of the Giza East Field of the Giza Necropolis immediately to the eastern side of the Great Pyramid of Giza,  built during the Fourth Dynasty of Egypt. It is the central of the three pyramids of the queens, located ten meters south of the Pyramid G1-a. It has a base of 50 meters and had an original height of 30 meters. Egyptologists Mark Lehner and Rainer Stadelmann attribute it to the queen Meritites I. Zahi Hawass, however, attributes it to Queen Noubet, who gave birth to Djedefre. It is one of the queen pyramids near Pyramid Khufu along with the other two queen pyramids Pyramid G1-a and Pyramid G1-c along with another smaller pyramid, not a queen pyramid, call Pyramid G1-d

See also
Pyramid G1-a
Pyramid G1-c
Pyramid G1-d
 List of Egyptian pyramids

References

Giza Plateau
Pyramids of the Fourth Dynasty of Egypt